Jason "Gong" Jones is an American musician, singer and songwriter. Originally a tattoo artist, he was the frontman and vocalist of rock band Drowning Pool from 2003 to 2005, providing vocals for the band's 2004 album Desensitized after Dave Williams's death. He is the lead vocalist with the band AM Conspiracy. He is currently also involved in a side project called Scumbag Allstars.

Career

Drowning Pool: 2003–2005

In 2003, Jason Jones was recruited by Texas-based metal band Drowning Pool (at the time C. J. Pierce, Stevie Benton, and Mike Luce) after the loss of their original frontman Dave Williams, who died of a heart condition while on the Ozzfest tour in August 2002.

Jones took the position as the band's frontman from 2003 to 2005. In that time period, he helped the band record their second full-length album Desensitized (2004), which brought hit songs such as "Step Up" (used for the motion picture The Punisher and the theme song for WWE WrestleMania XX), and the minor hits "Love and War" and "Killin' Me". Jones also recorded "Rise Up" from the WWE ThemeAddict: The Music, Vol. 6 album in 2004.

In 2005, Jones left the band due to musical differences and personal reasons. Around 2008, during an interview with Altitude, Jones mentioned his reasons to leave Drowning Pool:

In reply to this remark, Pierce and Benton stated that the reason why Jones was not paid was because the band had to bail him out of jail for between $60,000 and $65,000, which surpassed his share for the revenue of Desensitized.

In late 2020, during an interview with podcaster Scott Bowling, Jones recalled the day he left the band, when he found a woman "doing a bunch of blow" in the band bus, for which he embroiled into an argument with C.J. Pierce as Jones tried to lead the woman out of the bus.

Dino Cazares had his eye on Jones to form a new band after his own folded but the project never took place.

AM Conspiracy: 2006–2012

After leaving Drowning Pool, Jones formed the alternative metal group AM Conspiracy. The band's self-titled debut album was released on January 12, 2010.

Trivia
Jones collaborated with Ben Moody and Jason C. Miller for a song "The End Has Come" which appeared on the soundtrack of The Punisher 2004 film.
He was one of the singers that auditioned for Sepultura as the replacement for Max Cavalera, who left the band in 1996, but lost the position to Derrick Green.

Discography

Drowning Pool
Desensitized (2004)

AM Conspiracy
Out of the Shallow End EP (2007)
AM Conspiracy (2010)

Motorhick
 "Pedal to the Metal" (2014) - single

References

American heavy metal singers
Nu metal singers
Drowning Pool members
Living people
Year of birth missing (living people)
Musicians from Los Angeles
American tattoo artists
21st-century American singers